Ib Bergmann (born 16 May 1949) is a Danish weightlifter. He competed in the men's light heavyweight event at the 1972 Summer Olympics.

References

External links
 

1949 births
Living people
Danish male weightlifters
Olympic weightlifters of Denmark
Weightlifters at the 1972 Summer Olympics
Sportspeople from Copenhagen